Inwood station may refer to:
 Inwood station (LIRR)
 Inwood–207th Street (IND Eighth Avenue Line)
 Inwood station (New York Central Railroad)
 Inwood station (Pennsylvania Railroad)